Joseph Watson Rayment (17 January 1906 – 1969) was an English footballer who made 19 appearances in the Football League playing as an outside right for Hartlepools United in the 1927–28 season. He also played local football in the Hartlepool area. Rayment's son, also called Joe, made 260 appearances for Football League teams in the north-east of England, also playing on the right wing.

References

1906 births
1969 deaths
Footballers from Hartlepool
English footballers
Association football wingers
Hartlepool United F.C. players
English Football League players
Place of death missing